Yury Ivanovich Borisov (born 31 December 1956) is a Russian politician, former military strategist, and mathematician currently serving as Director General of Roscosmos.

From 2018 to 2022, he served as the Deputy Prime Minister of Russia, and from 2012 to 2018, as the Deputy Minister of Defence. He is a recipient of Order for Service to the Homeland in the Armed Forces of the USSR, 3d degree.

Biography
Yury Borisov was born on 31 December 1956 in Vyshny Volochyok. In 1980s he studied mathematics at the Faculty of Computational Mathematics and Cybernetics of Moscow State University from which he graduated in 1985. Borisov is married and has two children. For 20 years from 1978 to 1998 he was enlisted into the Armed Forces of both the Soviet Union and Russia. He was Federal Agency on Industry deputy head in October 2007 and became  Deputy Minister of Industry and Trade in July 2008. He was a Military-Industrial Commissioner for Russia in March 2011 and as of 12 November 2012 under Presidential Decree, Borisov was promoted to Deputy Minister of Defence of the Russian Federation.

On 7 May 2018, Borisov was nominated as Deputy Prime Minister for Defence and Space Industry in Dmitry Medvedev's Second Cabinet.

On 15 January 2020, Medvedev resigned as part of the cabinet, after President Vladimir Putin delivered the 2020 Presidential Address to the Federal Assembly, in which he proposed several amendments to the constitution. Borisov was kept on in Mikhail Mishustin's Cabinet..

In 2021 he was awarded the Order of the Republic of Serbia.

In 2022, he replaced Dmitry Rogozin as the new Director General of Roscosmos.

References

1956 births
Living people
1st class Active State Councillors of the Russian Federation
Moscow State University alumni
Deputy heads of government of the Russian Federation
21st-century Russian politicians
Heroes of the Russian Federation
People from Vyshny Volochyok
Recipients of the Order "For Merit to the Fatherland", 4th class
Recipients of the Order of Honour (Russia)
Recipients of the Order "For Service to the Homeland in the Armed Forces of the USSR", 3rd class
Deputy Defence Ministers of Russia